Hypomecis lunifera is a moth of the  family Geometridae. It is found in eastern Asia, including Japan, the Kuriles and the Korean Peninsula.

The wingspan is 48–64 mm.

External links
Moths of Japan

Boarmiini
Moths of Japan